Prehensile feet are lower limbs that possess prehensility, the ability to grasp like a hand. They are most commonly observed in monkeys, some of which also possess prehensile tails, and apes.  The term prehensile means "able to grasp" (from the Latin prehendere, to take hold of, to grasp).

Due to the development of bipedalism in humans, the hands became the focus of prehensility and the feet adjusted to more of a stabilizing role. It may be possible, however, that the foot does not reach its limits of dexterity due to the constant muscle tension needed in stabilizing and balancing the foot to hold up the legs and the rest of the frame.

In cases of people who are born without or lose their arms or hands, the feet, like the tongue and other parts of the body, are explored in greater function to stand in for the absent hands in performing daily human tasks. In many cases, greater prehensility is developed out of necessity and practice, and a person is able to type on a keyboard at impressive speeds.

Small objects may also be grasped between the toes and manipulated as with a hand, with the ankle functioning as a wrist. As toes are much shorter than fingers, and since the ball of the foot is so large and obtrusive, grasping does not function as in a normal hand and the foot is not able to hold very large or heavy objects.

See also
Mouth and foot painting

References

Vertebrate anatomy
Foot
Primate anatomy